Nowhere to Here is the sixth studio album by Blue Rodeo.

A more electric rock album than the band's 1993 outing Five Days in July, the album was not as well received by critics and fans as its predecessor. Despite this, "Side of the Road" and "Better Off As We Are" were notable singles.

Sarah McLachlan appears as a guest vocalist on "Save Myself", "Girl in Green", and "Brown-Eyed Dog".

Track listing

Chart performance

Certifications

References

1995 albums
Blue Rodeo albums